Edelbach since 1 January 1964 is a cadastral community of Allentsteig in Lower Austria, Austria.

In order to create the Döllersheim military training place, the inhabitants were resettled from 1938 onwards.

References

Zwettl District